Events from the year 1981 in art.

Events
 10 September – Picasso's painting Guernica is returned from New York to Madrid.
 Blek le Rat begins his stencil graffiti art in Paris.

Awards
 Archibald Prize: Eric Smith – Rudy Komon

Exhibitions
 9 June – Black Art an'done opens at Wolverhampton Art Gallery in England.

Works

 Tony Cragg – Britain as Seen from the North
 John Doubleday – Statue of Charlie Chaplin (Leicester Square, London)
 Don Eckland – Emergence (bronze, Eugene, Oregon)
 Bryan Hunt – Arch Falls (bronze, Houston, Texas)
 Nabil Kanso – Dreamvision series of paintings completed
 Ellsworth Kelly – Curve XXIV (sculpture, Seattle)
 Odd Nerdrum – Twilight
 Helmut Newton – Sie kommen! ("They're coming!", photographic diptych; published in French Vogue, November)
 Richard Serra – Tilted Arc, Federal Plaza, New York City (dismantled 1989)
 Andy Warhol – Myths series
 Aubrey Williams – Shostakovich series of paintings completed

Births
 15 April – Seth Wulsin, American artist.
 19 April – Saskia de Brauw, Dutch model and artist
 4 November – Paul Tucker, Canadian visual artist and graphic novel and webcomic illustrator.
 20 November – Scott Hutchison, Scottish singer, songwriter, guitarist and artist (d. 2018)

Deaths
 19 January – Francesca Woodman, 22, American photographer
 8 May – Grethe Jürgens, German painter (b. 1899)
 25 May – Armando de Armas Romero, Cuban painter (b. 1914)
 28 May – Jean Paul Slusser, painter, designer, art critic, professor, and director of the University of Michigan Museum of Art (b. 1886)
 16 June – Hans Coper, German-born English studio potter (b. 1920)
 19 June – Lotte Reiniger, German silhouette animator and film director (b.1899).
 29 June – Russell Drysdale, Australian artist (b. 1912).
 8 July – Isaac Soyer, Russian-born American painter, (b. 1902).
 16 July – John E. Berninger, American landscape painter (b. 1896)
 7 September – Christy Brown, Irish author, painter and poet (b. 1932).
 12 October – Enzo Plazzotta, Italian-born British sculptor (b. 1921).
 13 October – Antonio Berni, Argentine painter (b. 1905)
 20 October – Annot, German painter (b. 1894).
 23 October – Reg Butler, English sculptor (b. 1913)
 17 November – Nano Reid, Irish painter (b. 1905).
 22 November – Corrado Parducci, Italian-American architectural sculptor (b. 1900).
 28 December – Bram van Velde, Dutch painter (b. 1895)

Full date unknown

 Hubert Davis, American artist (b.1902).
 Art Frahm, American pin-up and advertising artist (b.1907).
 Pinchus Kremegne, Belarusian sculptor, painter and lithographer (b.1890).

See also
 1981 in fine arts of the Soviet Union

References

 
Years of the 20th century in art
1980s in art